Yelahanka Ward (Ward No. 1), officially known as Kempegowda Ward is one of the 198 Wards (an administrative region) of Bruhat Bengaluru Mahanagara Palike, an administrative body responsible for civic amenities and some infrastructural assets of the Greater Bangalore metropolitan area in the Indian state of Karnataka.

History

The history of municipal governance of Bangalore dates back to 27 March 1862, when nine leading citizens of the old city formed a Municipal Board under the Improvement of Towns Act of 1850 with a similar Municipal Board was also formed in the newer Cantonment area. The two boards were legalised in 1881, and functioned as two independent bodies called the Bangalore City Municipality and the Bangalore Civil and Military Station Municipality (Cantonment). The following year, half of the municipal councillors were permitted to be elected, property tax was introduced and greater powers given over police and local improvement.

In 1913 an honorary president was introduced, and seven years later made an elected position. An appointed Municipal Commissioner was introduced in 1926 on the Cantonment board as the executive authority.

After Indian independence, the two Municipal Boards were merged to form the Corporation of the City of Bangalore in 1949, under the Bangalore City Corporation Act. The corporation then consisted of 70 elected representatives and 50 electoral divisions and the office of Mayor introduced for the first time. The first elections were held in 1950.

In 1989, the BMP expanded to include 87 wards and further increased to 100 wards in 1995, covering an extra area of 75 sq. km. The council also included 40 additional members drawn from the parliament and the state legislature.

Yelahanka was the capital of Kempegowda, founder of Bangalore. In the 1980s this locality was developed as a Municipal council with 32 Wards and was also the Taluk headquarters prior to the formation of BBMP. Bangalore Mahanagara Palike (BMP), was the administering body of Bangalore till 2006. On 6 November 2006, the BMP Council was dissolved by the State Government upon the completion of its five-year term. In January 2007, the Karnataka Government issued a notification to merge the areas under then Bangalore Mahanagara Palike with seven City municipal council (CMC)'s (Rajarajeshwari City Municipal Council, Dasarahalli City Municipal Council, Bommanahalli City Municipal Council, Krishnarajapuram City Municipal Council, Mahadevapura City Municipal Council, Byatarayanapura City Municipal Council and Yelahanka City Municipal Council), one Town municipal council (TMC) (Kengeri Town Municipal Council) and 110 villages around the city to form a single administrative body, Bruhat Bengaluru Mahanagara Palike (111 villages mentioned in initial Notification. Later 2 villages omitted from the list and another village added before final Notification). The process was completed by April 2007 and the body was renamed Bruhat Bengaluru Mahanagara Palike (Greater Bangalore Municipal Corporation).

Yelahanka Ward has been renamed after Kempegowda, founder of Bangalore city. Yelahanka was a part of the erstwhile Vijayanagara Empire and also the birthplace of King Kempegowda I.

Salient features (2009 delimitation)

Salient features (2020 delimitation)http://bbmpwards2019.com/PDF/BBMP%20Final%20Delimitation-Gazte%20-%20Kannada.pdf

Demographics

Elected representatives

See also

 List of wards in Bangalore (2010-2020)
 List of wards in Bangalore
 2010 Greater Bengaluru Municipal Corporation election
 2015 Greater Bengaluru Municipal Corporation election

References

External links
 
 

Municipal wards of Bangalore